The 2013 SUGO GT 300km was the fourth round of the 2013 Super GT season. It took place on July 28, 2013.

Race result
Race result is as follows.

References

External links
Super GT official website 

SUGO GT 300km